Haptotrichion  is a genus of Australian plants in the tribe Gnaphalieae within the family Asteraceae.

 Species
 Haptotrichion colwillii Paul G.Wilson - Western Australia
 Haptotrichion conicum (B.L.Turner) Paul G.Wilson - Western Australia

References

Asteraceae genera
Endemic flora of Australia
Gnaphalieae
Taxa named by Paul G. Wilson